Phosphaalkenes (IUPAC name: alkylidenephosphanes) are organophosphorus compounds with double bonds between carbon and phosphorus(III) with the formula R2C=PR. In the compound phosphorine one carbon atom in benzene is replaced by phosphorus. The reactivity of phosphaalkenes is often compared to that of alkenes and not to that of imines because the HOMO of phosphaalkenes is not the phosphorus lone pair (as in imines the amine lone pair) but the double bond. Therefore like alkenes, phosphaalkenes engage in Wittig reactions, Peterson reactions, Cope rearrangements and Diels-Alder reactions.

The first phosphaalkene discovered was a phosphabenzene, by Mërkl in 1969. The first localized phosphaalkene was reported in 1976 by Gerd Becker as a keto-enol tautomerism akin a Brook rearrangement:

In the same year Harold Kroto established spectroscopically that thermolysis of Me2PH generates CH2=PMe.  A general method for the synthesis of phosphaalkenes is by 1,2-elimination of suitable precursors, initiated thermally or by base such as DBU, DABCO or triethylamine:

The Becker method is used in the synthesis of the phosphorus pendant of Poly(p-phenylene vinylene):
.
The reduction or oxidation of phosphaalynes can produce radical phosphorus ions.

References

Organophosphanes
Functional groups
Unsaturated compounds